Palpita pandurata is a moth in the family Crambidae. It was described by Inoue in 1996. It is found in Indonesia (Java).

References

Moths described in 1996
Palpita
Moths of Indonesia